There is a New Zealand horse of the year in each of the racing codes:

- Standardbred or harness racing, either pacers or trotters, and

- Thoroughbred racing or gallopers.

Harness Horse of the Year

The New Zealand Harness Horse of the Year award is awarded to the Standardbred horse who is voted to be the champion horse within a New Zealand racing season. This award is open to all racehorses racing within New Zealand, regardless of age and sex. Overseas performances are now included.

Thoroughbred Racehorse of the Year

The New Zealand Champion Racehorse of the Year is awarded to the Thoroughbred horse who is voted to be the best racehorse within a New Zealand racing season. This award is open to all racehorses racing within New Zealand, regardless of age and sex. Overseas performances are now included.

See also
 Thoroughbred racing in New Zealand
 Harness racing in New Zealand
 New Zealand Racing Hall of Fame
 New Zealand Trotting Hall of Fame
 List of leading Thoroughbred racehorses

References

Horse racing in New Zealand